Navidad Formation is a marine Neogene sedimentary formation located in Central Chile. The formation is known for its diverse and abundant fossil record and is considered the reference unit for the marine Neogene in Chile. Originally described by Charles Darwin in 1846 the formation has attracted the attention of numerous prominent geologists and paleontologists since then. As a key formation Navidad has been subject to a series of differing interpretations and scientific disputes over time.

History 
Charles Darwin saw the formation in September 1834 during the second voyage of HMS Beagle. He became the first to describe it 1846 when he published his book Geological Observations on South America in 1846 and it was named by Darwin after the nearby town of Navidad. In this book Darwin calls the formation "Formation of Navidad" and "Sandstone Formation at Navidad". There are no signs of that Darwin would have attempted to make a formal definition of the formation.

Early fossil descriptions from Navidad Formation were those of George Sowerby in Geological Observations on South America (1846) and by Rodolfo Amando Philippi (1887).

Gustav Steinmann redefined the Navidad Formation in 1895, then called Piso Navidad, by giving it a Lower Tertiary age and spanning much of south-central Chile. In 1934 Juan Brüggen separated Piso Concepción from Steinmanns Piso Navidad after showing there was a discordance between them. Humberto Fuenzalida published research on fossils of the formation in 1950–1951.

Juan Tavera further narrowed the age of the formation in 1968 and 1979 by proposing a Burdigalian (Lower Miocene) age for Navidad, Lincancheo and Rapel which were then the three subunits of Navidad Formation. Tavera's 1979 subdivision scheme for Navidad Formation remained popular until it was superseded in 2006 by a new one.

Outcrops and surface morphology 

Navidad Formation is located in the Chilean Coast Range in Central Chile at the latitudes of 33°00' S–34°30' S. The formation crops out more-less continuously along coastal bluffs displaying well-preserved exposures. The coastal exposures extends from the vicinities of San Antonio in the north to Boca Pupuya in the south over a length of 16 km. Morphologically the coastal zone near the formation has been divided into four distinct zones: a coastal platform of rocky outcrops and sand beaches, marine terraces dipping gently towards the sea, dissected coastal plain at the mouth of Rapel River and fluvial terraces in the northern and southern shores of Rapel River.

Stratigraphy and lithology
The formation rests above both an Upper Cretaceous formation called Punta Tocopalma Formation and the Paleozoic granitic basement. It lies below Licancheu Formation to which it has a concordant contact to. The formation has a thickness of 100 to 200 meters. The sedimentary rocks that make up the formation includes a basal conglomerate stratigraphically followed by intercalated sandstone and siltstone with smaller occurrences of conglomerate and coquina.

There are more than one subdivision scheme for the stratigraphy of the formation. A scheme made by Juan Tavera in 1979 that was by 2005 the most used compromises tree members Navidad, Licancheo and Rapel. A new scheme proposed in 2006 elevated Tavera's sub-units Licancheo (renamed Licancheu) and Rapel to formations leaving the new definition of Navidad Formation as the former sub-unit Navidad. The rationale for subdividing Tavera's Navidad Formation was that the sub-units were separated by regional discontinuities.

The stratotype of the formation is the coastal bluff west of Punta Perro. The stratopype does not coincide with the original description by Darwin.

The sediments of the formation include detrital pyroxene, amphibole, garnet, zircon and other heavy minerals. Pyroxene is the most common heavy mineral in the lower sections of Navidad Formation. Part of the sediments are believed to have originated from the basement of the Chilean Coast Range based on the affinities of garnet with the coastal lithologies. Analysis of amphiboles and pyroxenes have led to the conclusion that they and other sediments originate from volcanic and subvolcanic rocks from the Central Valley and the Andean Cordillera. Over-all three erosion-and-deposition events have been distinguished in Navidad Formation.

Fossil record 
The formation contains a great variety of fossils. Among the macrofossils there are remnants from sharks, crustaceans and gastropods. Among microfossils there are ostracodes and foraminifera. In addition there are fossils of leaves and pollen. The teeth of the shark Odontaspis ferox have been identified in the formation.

Crustaceans 
Fossils of the marine crab genera Cancer, Hepatus, Pilumnus, Pinnotheres, Trichopeltarion, Callianassa, Pinnixa and Proterocarcinus have been reported from Navidad Formation. Navidad Formation host two of the first fossil crab species to be described from Chile: Cancer tyros and Pinnotheres promaucanus both described by Rodolfo Amando Philippi in 1887. Notably, the type specimen of Pinnotheres promaucanus has presumably been lost at the Chilean National Museum of Natural History.

Ostracod species identified in Navidad Formation numbered 28 by 1978.

Molluscs 
Gastropod shells are the most common macrofossils of Navidad Formation. A large number of these shells are remarkably well preserved. The mollusc fossil fauna of Navidad Formation is remarkably similar fossil faunas of the same age found in Peru. Some of the gastropod species found in Navidad Formation are Miltha vidali, Acanthina katzi, Olivancillaria claneophila, Testallium cepa, Ficus distans, Eucrassatella ponderosa, Glycymeris ibariformis and Glycymeris colchaguensis.

Flora 
There are fossil spores, pollen, wood, cuticles and fresh water algae in the formation. Pollen and spore associations are dominated by land species and reflect that land flora was of both Gondwana and Neotropical affinities. In a 2011 study Barreda et al. identified a total of 65 morphospecies of pollen and spores. More specifically these consisted of at least 42 angiosperms,  14 pteridophytes, seven gymnosperms and two bryophytes. The dominant gymnosperms are the Podocarpaceae while the angiosperms lack any dominant family. Charcoal found together with pumice is thought to indicate that wildfires ignited by volcanic eruptions were common on land where Mediterranean climate prevailed in the Miocene as well as today.

Trace fossils 
The trace fossils representing the ichnogenera of Zoophycos isp. and Chondrites isp. can be found in Navidad Formation.

Scientific controversy 
Over the years different age estimates for Navidad Formation have been proposed and led to a substantial debate.

Based on a biostratrigraphic analysis Encinas et al. (2008b) suggested a Tortonian to Zanclean (Late Miocene–Early Pliocene) age for Navidad Formation. They further suggested that Oligocene–Early Miocene shark teeth that occur in basal conglomerate are reworked material originating at another formation that re–sedimented in Navidad Formation. The formation was interpreted as including both deep marine and shallow marine depositional environments.

In 2013 Gutiérrez et al. published an article in Andean Geology claiming an Early to Middle Miocene age for Navidad Formation. Further, Gutiérrez et al. (2013) disagreed with Encina et al.'s (2008b) suggestion of a deep marine depositional environment for Navidad Formation proposing a shallow marine environment instead. This prompted a response from Encina and his associates (Finger et al., 2013) contesting elements of these claims but stressing it is true that some of the formation is of shallow marine origin and that at least part of the formation is of Early Miocene origin. In their comment Finger et al. (2013) revealed that previous identification of foraminera was erroneous as was also the Late Miocene–Early Pleistocene age estimate based on incorrect identification of foraminifera. Gutiérrez and his associates defended their findings in a reply in 2013 and the exchange continued in 2014.

See also 

 Cerro Ballena
 Coquimbo Formation
 Lacui Formation
 Ranquil Formation
 Santo Domingo Formation

References 

Geologic formations of Chile
Miocene Series of South America
Neogene Chile
Sandstone formations
Siltstone formations
Conglomerate formations
Shallow marine deposits
Fossiliferous stratigraphic units of South America
Paleontology in Chile
Geology of Valparaíso Region
Geology of O'Higgins Region